John Arnold Fielding (2 September 1939 – 1 August 2022) was an English professional footballer who played as a winger in the Football League for Brentford, Southport and Grimsby Town. He later had a long career in non-League football and also played in South Africa.

Playing career

Early years 
A right winger or midfielder, Fielding began his career as an amateur at Everton. Following four seasons at Goodison Park, he transferred to Lancashire Combination First Division club Wigan Athletic. A record of nearly a goal every other game between September 1959 and March 1961 earned Fielding a £500 transfer to Football League Fourth Division club Southport. He broke into the team on a regular basis during the 1961–62 season, scoring 13 goals in 48 appearances. He went even better the 1962–63 season, with 11 goals in 32 appearances, before departing the club in March 1963. Fielding scored made 86 appearances and scored 24 goals for Southport.

Brentford 
On 26 March 1963, Fielding transferred to Fourth Division high-flyers Brentford for a £7,000 fee. He had impressed manager Malky McDonald with his performance while a Southport player at Griffin Park in a 3–3 draw earlier in the season. After the return fixture, McDonald tabled a big-money offer. Fielding made seven appearances in what remained of the 1962–63 season to help the Bees over the line to the Division Four championship. He made semi-regular appearances in the Third Division and made 31 appearances, before fully breaking into the team in the 1964–65 season, when he made 42 appearances and scored 10 league goals. After making just 9 appearances in the first half of the 1965–66 season, Fielding left the Bees in December 1965. He made 93 appearances and scored 21 goals during  years at Griffin Park.

Grimsby Town 
Fielding joined Third Division club Grimsby Town in December 1965. Though not a regular pick for the team, he managed eight goals in 31 appearances before departing in 1967.

Port Elizabeth City 
Fielding moved to South Africa in 1967, where he linked up with former Brentford teammate Matt Crowe at National Football League club Port Elizabeth City. He had a successful 1967 season, winning the league championship. Fielding departed the club at the end of the 1968 season.

Return to Southport 
Fielding returned to Third Division club Southport in November 1968 and made a first team appearance in a Lancashire Senior Cup match on 3 January 1969. In February 1969, he departed to join Tranmere Rovers on trial.

Return to Wigan Athletic 
Fielding returned to Wigan Athletic in 1969 for a second spell with the now high-flying Northern Premier League club. He made 49 appearances and scored eight goals during the 1969–70 season and helping the Latics to a second-successive runners-up finish in the league. He departed at the end of the season.

Non-League football 
Fielding wound down his career with spells at Northern Premier League clubs Altrincham, Ellesmere Port Town, South Liverpool and Runcorn. Work commitments led to his retirement from football in 1976.

Personal life 
While an amateur with Everton, Fielding served an apprenticeship as a plumber with Arthur Peat.

Career statistics

Honours 
Wigan Athletic
 Lancashire FA Challenge Trophy: 1959–60
Port Elizabeth City

 National Football League: 1967

References

1939 births
2022 deaths
British plumbers
Footballers from Liverpool
English footballers
Association football wingers
Wigan Athletic F.C. players
Southport F.C. players
Brentford F.C. players
Grimsby Town F.C. players
Port Elizabeth City F.C. players
Altrincham F.C. players
Ellesmere Port Town F.C. players
South Liverpool F.C. players
Runcorn F.C. Halton players
Northern Premier League players
English Football League players
National Football League (South Africa) players
English expatriate footballers
English expatriate sportspeople in South Africa